Tin Wai (born 11 February  1963) is a Burmese politician who currently serves as a House of Nationalities member of parliament for Tanintharyi No. 6 . He is a member of National League for Democracy.

Political career
Tin Wai was elected as an Amyotha Hluttaw MP, winning a majority of 40,506 votes, from Tanintharyi Region No.6 parliamentary constituency. He also serves as a member of Amyotha Hluttaw Hluttaw Rights Committee.

References

National League for Democracy politicians
1963 births
Living people
People from Tanintharyi Region